Haluk Piyes (born March 30, 1975) is a Turkish-German actor.

Filmography

Television

Awards 
 2004 Locarno International Film Festival, Bester Film: En Garde
 2008 International Film Fest Bukarest, Best Film: "Asyl"

References

External links

1975 births
German people of Turkish descent
German male film actors
German male television actors
Living people